The  is a Japanese academic society founded in 1912. It publishes journals and monographs and helps disseminate information about the birds of Japan and ornithology more generally.

Journals
  (1915–1986; vols. 1–34)
  (1986–; vols. 35–)
 Ornithological Science (2002–; vols. 1–)

Presidents
The presidents of the Society from its inception have included:
 Iijima Isao (1912–1921)
 Takatsukasa Nobusuke (1922–1946)
  (1946–1947)
 Kuroda Nagamichi (1947–1963)
 Yamashina Yoshimaro (1963–1970)
 Kuroda Nagahisa (1970–1975)
  (1975–1981)
 Kuroda Nagahisa (1981–1990)

See also
 Yamashina Institute for Ornithology
 Japanese Society for Preservation of Birds
 Wild Bird Society of Japan
 List of birds of Japan

References

External links
  Japanese Society for Preservation of Birds
  Japanese Society for Preservation of Birds

Ornithological organizations
1912 establishments in Japan
Environmental organizations based in Japan